Elections to Swindon Borough Council took place on 6 May 2021 as part of the 2021 local elections in the United Kingdom.  The Conservatives made 6 gains and secured a majority of 15, their best performance since the 2011 elections.

Results summary

Ward results

Blunsdon & Highworth

Central

Chiseldon & Lawn

Covingham & Dorcan

Eastcott

Gorse Hill & Pinehurst

Haydon Wick

Liden, Eldene & Park South

Lydiard & Freshbrook

Mannington & Western

Old Town

Penhill & Upper Stratton

Priory Vale

Ridgeway

Rodbourne Cheney

Shaw

St Andrew's

St Margaret & South Marston

Walcot & Park North

Wroughton & Wichelstowe

By-elections

Priory Vale

Notes

References 

2021
Swindon
2020s in Wiltshire